10th Supply and Transportation Battalion may refer to:

 10th Transportation Battalion (United States)
 10th Sustainment Brigade 
 10th Brigade Support Battalion of the 1st Brigade Combat Team, 10th Mountain Division (United States), the successor unit of the original 10th S&T